Barnard's Star b (also designated GJ 699 b) was a proposed super-Earth-mass exoplanet orbiting Barnard's Star in the constellation of Ophiuchus, six light-years away from Earth. The exoplanet's discovery by an international team of astronomers – including the European Southern Observatory and Carnegie Institution for Science – was officially announced on 14 November 2018. More recent studies, in 2021 and 2022, have concluded that the radial velocity signal corresponding to Barnard's Star b is most likely an artifact of stellar activity, and thus the planet does not exist.

Characteristics

Barnard's Star b technically remains a planet candidate as it has been proposed with a confidence figure of 99%. The research team that made the announcement will continue observations to ensure that no improbable variations in brightness and motion in the star might account for the discovery. Direct imaging opportunities of the planet from large ground-based telescopes, or potentially the Nancy Grace Roman Space Telescope, are expected within ten years of 2018. There is an outside chance that a transit of the star might also allow for imaging.

The planet was proposed through the radial velocity method, the most common planet-hunting technique. A "wobble" observed in Barnard's Star's motion was confirmed to have a period of about 233 days, corresponding to a semi-major axis of 0.4 AU for a proposed companion. The mass of the likely planetary body was then deduced to be about 3.2 Earth mass. Lead astronomer Ignasi Ribas notes: "We used observations from seven different instruments, spanning 20 years of measurements, making this one of the largest and most extensive datasets ever used for precise radial-velocity studies."

Its orbital distance, though close to the star by solar system standards, is around the snow line for a dim red dwarf like Barnard's Star. This is the point where volatile compounds such as water condense to form ice and thus outside the assumed habitable zone where temperatures are right for surficial liquid water. However, new research suggests that heat generated by geothermal processes could warm pockets of water beneath the surface of the planet, potentially providing havens for life to evolve. 

Astronomers expect to find more such "snow line" planets as proto-planetary accretion is favorable in this temperature range. A second planetary companion for Barnard's Star has been suggested based on unconfirmed "wobbles" in the current system.

References

Disproven exoplanets
Ophiuchus (constellation)